Harold Coward  (born 1936) is a Canadian scholar of bioethics and religious studies. A Bachelor in Divinity (Christian Theology), he earned a doctoral degree in Philosophy in 1973 from the McMaster University. He was a professor at University of Victoria and the University of Calgary. He is particularly known for his studies of Indian religions, as an editor of the Encyclopedia of Hinduism, and has been a Fellow of the Royal Society of Canada since 1991.

Coward is the author of many publications and has been profiled in The Vancouver Sun.

Coward's works and publications have been discussed multiple times in popular media.
In 1994, The Vancouver Sun described Coward as "one of the world's leaders in creating a constructive religious response to the population crisis".
In 1997, Coward was described as "arguably the most dynamic religion scholar in Canada today".

Coward was the first director at the University of Calgary Press (1981–83).

Coward was director of the University of Victoria's Centre for Studies in Religion and Society.
Coward is a director at Genome British Columbia.

An honorary collection of essays has been dedicated to Coward.

Publications (selected)
 Coward, Harold. (2019). Word, Chant and Song: Spiritual Transformation in Hinduism, Buddhism, Islam and Sikhism. Albany, NY: State University of New York Press. 
Coward, Harold. (2014). Fifty Years of Religious Studies in Canada: A Personal Retrospective. Waterloo, Ontario, Canada: Wilfrid Laurier University Press. .

Dedicated to Coward

References

Living people
Canadian religious writers
Academic staff of the University of Victoria
Place of birth missing (living people)
1936 births